Curculigoside A is a curculigoside found in Curculigo orchioides.

References 

Phenol glucosides
Curculigo
Phenol ethers
Carboxylate esters